The 2004 ICC Awards were held at Alexandra Palace in London, England on 7 September 2004. They were the inaugural episode and were aimed at recognizing the best individual and team performances of the previous year.

Sponsors
In association with the Federation of International Cricketers' Associations (FICA), Hyundai were the presenting sponsors of the 2004 ICC Awards ceremony.

Other sponsors and partners were:

Platinum sponsors: LG
Broadcast partner: SET Max
Trophy sponsors: Swarovski

Selection Committee
Nominees were voted on by a 50-member academy of current and ex-players and officials from among players chosen by the ICC Selection Committee, chaired by ICC Cricket Hall of Famer Richie Benaud.

Selection Committee members:

 Richie Benaud (chairman)
 Ian Botham
 Sunil Gavaskar
 Michael Holding
 Barry Richards

Winners and nominees
The winners and nominees for various individual awards were:

Cricketer of the Year

Winner: Rahul Dravid (Ind)

Dravid's 2003–04 performance:
Tests: 9 matches, 1241 runs, 3 centuries, 4 half-centuries, 11 catches
ODIs: 30 matches, 960 runs, 1 century, 8 half-centuries, 15 catches, 4 stumpings

Nominees: Andrew Flintoff (Eng), Steve Harmison (Eng), Matthew Hayden (Aus), Jacques Kallis (SA), Brian Lara (WI), V.V.S. Laxman (Ind), Muttiah Muralitharan (SL), Ricky Ponting (Aus), Virender Sehwag (Ind)

Test Player of the Year

Winner: Rahul Dravid (Ind)
Nominees: Andrew Flintoff (Eng), Adam Gilchrist (Aus), Jason Gillespie (Aus), Steve Harmison (Eng), Matthew Hayden (Aus), Brian Lara (WI), V.V.S. Laxman (Ind), Jacques Kallis (SA), Muttiah Muralitharan (SL), Ricky Ponting (Aus), Virender Sehwag (Ind)

ODI Player of the Year

Winner: Andrew Flintoff (Eng)
Nominees: Stephen Fleming (NZ), Chris Gayle (WI), Adam Gilchrist (Aus), Jason Gillespie (Aus), Matthew Hayden (Aus), Jacques Kallis (SA), V.V.S. Laxman (Ind), Muttiah Muralitharan (SL), Shaun Pollock (SA), Ricky Ponting (Aus), Abdul Razzaq (Pak), Sachin Tendulkar (Ind), Heath Streak (Zim), Andrew Symonds (Aus), Chaminda Vaas (SL), Daniel Vettori (NZ)

Emerging Player of the Year

Winner: Irfan Pathan (Ind)
Nominees: Tino Best (WI), Michael Clarke (Aus), Imran Farhat (Pak), Umar Gul (Pak), Yasir Hameed (Pak), Hamish Marshall (NZ), Devon Smith (WI)

Umpire of the Year

Winner: Simon Taufel (Aus)

Spirit of Cricket
Winner: New Zealand

ICC World XI Teams

ICC Test Team of the Year

Ricky Ponting was selected as the captain of the Test Team of the Year. In addition to a wicket-keeper, 9 other players were announced as follows:

 Matthew Hayden
 Herschelle Gibbs
 Ricky Ponting
 Rahul Dravid
 Brian Lara
 Jacques Kallis
 Adam Gilchrist (wicket-keeper)
 Chaminda Vaas
 Shane Warne
 Jason Gillespie
 Steve Harmison

ICC ODI Team of the Year

Ricky Ponting was also selected as the captain of the ODI Team of the Year. In addition to a wicket-keeper, 9 other players were announced as follows:

 Adam Gilchrist (wicket-keeper)
 Sachin Tendulkar
 Chris Gayle
 Ricky Ponting
 Brian Lara
 Virender Sehwag
 Jacques Kallis
 Andrew Flintoff
 Shaun Pollock
 Chaminda Vaas
 Jason Gillespie

See also

 International Cricket Council
 ICC Awards
 Sir Garfield Sobers Trophy (Cricketer of the Year)
 ICC Test Player of the Year
 ICC ODI Player of the Year
 David Shepherd Trophy (Umpire of the Year)
 ICC Women's Cricketer of the Year
 ICC Test Team of the Year
 ICC ODI Team of the Year

References

International Cricket Council awards and rankings
Crick
2004 in cricket